Forthmann House, now known as USC Community House, is a Los Angeles Historic-Cultural Monument (No. 103) located in the North University Park Historic District of West Adams, Los Angeles, California. It is a  Victorian house built 1887, designed by Burgess J. Reeve. It was relocated in 1989 from its original location.  A secondary structure known as the Forthmann Carriage House was moved from its original location to its new home in Angelino Heights at 812 E Edgeware Rd.

See also
 List of Los Angeles Historic-Cultural Monuments in South Los Angeles

References

External links
 Big Orange Landmarks article on Forthmann House
  "This Old House Born Again", Los Angeles Times, January 8, 1989, part 1/part 2
 Los Angeles Times, Jan. 25, 1981 here

Houses in Los Angeles
West Adams, Los Angeles
Houses completed in 1887
Los Angeles Historic-Cultural Monuments
Italianate architecture in California
Victorian architecture in California
Relocated buildings and structures in California